Méresse is a surname. Notable people with the surname include:

David Méresse (1931–2020), French footballer
Zaïna Méresse (1935–2014), Mahorese politician